"Sidi Mansour" (in Tunisian dialect "سيدي منصور" ) is a popular folkloric song from Tunisia.

Over the past few decades, various renditions of the song have been created. The song was made famous in 2000 when the Tunisian artist Saber Rebaï (in Tunisian  صابر الرباعي) released his version. Since then, "Sidi Mansour" has been subject to many covers in Arabic and many other languages. In 2021,  Enisa Nikaj a Brooklyn born American singer of Albanian descent released the song Count My Blessings which was completely inspired from Tunisian Song Sidi Mansour.   Boney M.'s "Ma Baker" was inspired by the original Tunisian folk song.

Rebaï's "Sidi Mansour" song should not however be confused with "Sidi Mansour" by Algerian raï artist Cheikha Rimitti. Her rendition is another "Sidi Mansour" not related to the Rebaï song.

History
Numerous variants of the song exist with similar lyrics dating back hundreds of years. The song is dedicated to the Tunisian Sufi saint Sidi Mansour, whose name was Mansour Ghulam, and lived prior to the 15th century. He was a native of the city Sfax, where his tomb is. The city quarter is also named after him.

Versions prior to Saber Rebaï
The song was recorded by Mohammed Jarrari  (in Arabic  محمّد الجراري) in his audio cassette Folklore tunisien (in Arabic فولكلور تونسي ) as "Sidi Mansour Baba Bahri" (in Arabic  سيدي منصور بابا بحري).

A version was recorded in 1975 by Mohamed Hanesh (in Arabic محمد الحنش).

Saber Rebaï version

The song was made famous by Saber Rebaï when he recorded it in his same titled album Sidi Mansour released in 2000. The music is a popular tune from Tunisian traditional folklore and the lyrics were written by Sameh al Ajami. The record was produced by Hamid al Sha'iri and the very popular music video is directed by Fadi Kenaan. The song is also known as "Allah Allah, ya baba", "Sidi Mansour (ya baba)", expressions used many times in the lyrics.

Other versions and samplings

The song has been subject to a huge number of interpretations by Arab and international artists and remixes by many DJs in original Arabic version and in other languages.

Most notably, it became the basis for the Boney M. hit "Ma Baker" in 1977 largely based on the 1975 hit by Mohamed Hanesh.

Parts of the song have also been sampled many times in other released songs in Arabic and other languages.
Arabic versions were done by Bled Runner featuring Dida Brother (in album The Rough Guide To Arabesque), by Cheb Rayan featuring Rima and a mix by Malik Adouane
Instrumental versions were done by Omar Khorshid
Hakim also recorded a version of this song mixing flamenco elements with Spanish and Arabic lyrics.
Robert Plant performed "Sidi Mansour" with Juldeh Camara performed at World of Music, Arts and Dance (WOMAD) in Abu Dhabi. 
"Se Pira Sovara", is a version recorded in Greek and Arabic in 2004 by Sarbel and was a big hit for him in Greece.
"Mariš li" (in Serbian Мариш ли) is a Serbian language song sung by Viki Miljković using the music of "Sidi Mansour" taken from her 2003 album of same name.
"Mavişim" is a Turkish song sung by İbrahim Tatlıses using the music of "Sidi Mansour". It is found on his album Yetmez mi.
"Za Yam Maghror Laila" with the music of Sidi Mansour is a Pakistani song sung by various artists in Urdu / Pashto. 

Mario Più & Mauro Picotto released the song "Arabian Pleasures" in 1999 which uses the melody of "Sidi Mansour". A vocal version was later contributed by Egyptian/Algerian singer Amal Wahby.
"Allah Allah Ne Zaman" is a Turkish song sung by Güzin and Baha using the music of "Sidi Mansour".
"Shpirti im" is an Albanian song sung by Ervis Bix using the music of "Sidi Mansour".
 “PAF.no”, a song by the Norwegian rap duo Karpe, has a chorus containing parts of the song.

Se Pira Sovara (Greek: Σε πήρα σοβαρά, meaning "I took you seriously") is a 2004 bilingual song in Greek and Arabic by the Greek-Cypriot and Lebanese origin artist Sarbel based on Tunisian singer Saber Rebaï's Arabic song Sidi Mansour and became highly successful in Greece and Cyprus. The song is the debut single by Sarbel taken from his debut album Parakseno sinesthima (Παράξενο συναίσθημα).

The song features Greek songstress Irini Merkouri, who first introduced the young singer Sarbel to fans in Greece, but also across the Middle East. The song was also shot as a music video.

The album also contains a remixed version entitled "Se pira sovara (Diva) (Sidi Mansour) - Sfera mix" by Nikos Nikolakopoulos.

Charts 

Ya Baba is a 2016 bilingual song in English and Arabic by the Pakistani British artist Zack Knight featuring Rami Beatz. It is largely based on Tunisian  singer Saber Rebaï's Arabic song "Sidi Mansour" with large samplings from the song. Zack Knight wrote the additional lyrics. It was produced by Rami Beatz and Dot Da Genius and copyrighted to Quantize Music LLC. The song was highly successful in UK's Official Asian Download Chart Top 40 published by The Official Charts reaching number 2. It stayed 13 weeks on that chart. The song also received heavy airplay in South Asian venues as well as radio stations throughout the Middle East. An Arab-themed music video was also released.

References

2000 singles
Arabic-language songs
2004 singles
Year of song unknown